Kyd is a surname. Notable people with the surname include:

 Gerald Kyd (born 1973), South African actor
 Jerry Kyd, British naval officer
 Jesper Kyd (born 1972), Danish video game and film music composer
 Michael Kyd (born 1977), English professional footballer
 Robert Kyd (1746–1793), British botanist
 Thomas Kyd (1558–1594), English dramatist
 Warren Kyd (born 1939), New Zealand politician
 William Kyd (fl. 1430–1453), English 15th-century pirate
James Kyd (1786–1836), master shipbuilder of the East India Company

See also
 Kid (disambiguation)
 Joseph Clayton Clarke (1856–1937) or 'Kyd', British artist
 Cayman Islands dollar having KYD currency code
 Abbreviation of kiloyard